Konstantin Päts' fifth cabinet was in office in Estonia from 21 October 1933 to 9 May 1938, when it was succeeded by Kaarel Eenpalu's second cabinet.

Members

This cabinet's members were the following:

References

Cabinets of Estonia